Orest Danilovich Khvolson or Chwolson (November 22 (N.S. December 4), 1852 – May 11, 1934) was a Russian physicist and honorary member of the Soviet Academy of Sciences (1920). He is most noted for being one of the first to study the gravitational lens effect.

Early life and education
Orest, son of the noted Orientalist Daniel Chwolson, was born in Saint Petersburg. He graduated from St. Petersburg University in 1873.

Career
Khvolson began teaching at his alma mater in 1876 and became a professor in 1891. He authored works on electricity, magnetism, photometry, and actinometry. He proposed the designs of an actinometer and a pyrheliometer, which would be used by the Russian weather stations for many years.

After 1896, Khvolson was mainly engaged in compiling the five-volume Physics Course (Курс физики), which would improve immensely the teaching of physics throughout the country and remain a principal textbook in universities for years to come. It was even translated into the German, French, and Spanish languages.

His most noted accomplishment was in 1924, when he published about gravitational lenses in Astronomische Nachrichten, a scientific journal on astronomy.  In the article he mentioned the “halo effect” of gravitation when the source, lens, and observer are in near-perfect alignment (now referred to as the Einstein ring), although he did not explicitly discuss the use of the ring as lens.

The concept of gravitational lenses did not get much attention until 1936, when Albert Einstein wrote about the gravitational lens effect. The "halo" effect of a gravitational lens, where one source (sun or galaxy) produces a ring around another source is referred to as an Chwolson ring, or Einstein ring.

He became an honorary member of the Soviet Academy of Sciences, awarded the Order of the Red Banner of Labour. The crater Khvolson on the Moon is named after him.

Personal life and demise
Khvolson died in Leningrad, the same city he was born, but its name had changed.

Publications

References 

Russian physicists
Russian people of Jewish descent
1852 births
1934 deaths
Scientists from Saint Petersburg
Corresponding members of the Saint Petersburg Academy of Sciences
Honorary Members of the USSR Academy of Sciences